Zažablje is a municipality of Dubrovnik-Neretva County in southern Dalmatia, Croatia. It is located between Opuzen, Metković and Neum.

In the 2011 census, Zažablje had a total population of 757, with Croats making up an absolute majority with 99.74% of the population.

The villages in the municipality and their respective populations are:
 Mlinište, 335
 Bijeli Vir, 292
 Badžula, 73
 Mislina, 50
 Dobranje, 6
 Vidonje, 1

References

External links
 

Populated places in Dubrovnik-Neretva County
Municipalities of Croatia